Maytee Pungpoh is a professional footballer from Thailand. He currently plays for Ayutthaya United in the Thai League 3.

He played for Krung Thai Bank FC in the 2008 AFC Champions League group stages.

Asian Champions League Appearances

References

Living people
Metee Pungpoh
1984 births
Metee Pungpoh
Association football forwards
Metee Pungpoh